The 2019–20 Tottenham Hotspur F.C. Women season was the club's 35th season in existence but only their first as a professional team having been promoted to the FA Women's Super League, the highest level of the football pyramid, at the end of the 2018–19 season. Along with competing in the WSL, the club also contested two domestic cup competitions: the FA Cup and the League Cup.

On 13 March 2020, in line with the FA's response to the coronavirus pandemic, it was announced the season was temporarily suspended until at least 3 April 2020. After further postponements, the season was ultimately ended prematurely on 25 May 2020 with immediate effect. Tottenham sat in 6th at the time but were overtaken by Everton and finished in 7th on sporting merit after The FA Board's decision to award places on a points-per-game basis.

Squad

Pre-season 
As part of Tottenham's preseason, the team traveled to Spain to compete in the invitational Ramon de Carranza Trophy, marking the first time women's teams took part. Spurs beat Real Betis in one semi-final with Athletic Bilbao beating CD Tacón in the other. The winners met each in the final the following day with Athletic Bilbao winning on penalties. Tottenham also scheduled five domestic friendlies against English opposition with every game open to the public.

FA Women's Super League 

In response to the record viewing figures during the 2019 FIFA Women's World Cup, three fixtures were moved to Premier League grounds. These included two Spurs games: the away trip to Chelsea on the opening weekend and Tottenham's hosting of the North London derby in November. The latter saw an attendance of 38,262, setting a new FA WSL attendance record.

Results summary

Results by matchday

Results

League table

Women's FA Cup 

As a member of the top two tiers, Tottenham entered the FA Cup in the fourth round, beating National League Division One side Barnsley in their opening fixture. A successive 5–0 Cup victory, this time over Championship team Coventry United, set up a quarter-final tie against North London derby rivals Arsenal which was picked for television by BBC. However, the match was postponed due to the coronavirus pandemic before the season was ultimately curtailed. On 24 July 2020 it was announced the 2019–20 FA Cup would resume play during the 2020–21 season starting with the quarter-final ties rescheduled for the weekend of 26/27 September 2020.

FA Women's League Cup

Group stage

Squad statistics

Appearances 

Starting appearances are listed first, followed by substitute appearances after the + symbol where applicable. Players listed with no appearances have been in the matchday squad but only as unused substitutes.

|-
|colspan="14"|Joined during 2020–21 season but competed in the postponed 2019–20 FA Cup:

|-
|colspan="14"|Players away from the club on loan:

|-
|colspan="14"|Players who appeared for Tottenham Hotspur but left during the season:

|}

Goalscorers

Transfers

Transfers in

Loans in

Transfers out

Loans out

References 

Tottenham Hotspur